Li Jing or Jing Li may refer to:

Surname Li 
Li Jing (deity), fictional character in Fengshen Yanyi
Li Jing (Tang dynasty) (571–649), general during the Tang dynasty
Li Jing (Southern Tang) (916–961), ruler of the Southern Tang dynasty
Li Jing (PRC general) (born 1930), general in the People's Liberation Army of China
Li Ching (actress) (1948–2018), China-born Hong Kong actress
Li Jing (TV presenter) (born 1962), Taiwanese television show hostess and model
Jing Li (chemist), China-born chemist and professor at Rutgers University
Jing Ulrich (born 1967), née Li, managing director and vice chairman of Asia Pacific at JPMorgan Chase
Joseph Li Jing (born 1968), Chinese Roman Catholic bishop
Li Jing (actor) (born 1978), Chinese xiangsheng and film actor

Sportspeople
Li Jing (gymnast) (born 1970), Chinese gymnast, world champion and Olympic medalist
Li Ching (table tennis) (born 1975), China-born Hong Kong table tennis player
Li Jing (volleyball) (born 1991), Chinese volleyball player

Surname Jing 
Ching Li (1945–2017), Hong Kong actress

See also
Book of Rites, also known as Classic of Rites (禮經; Li Jing), a Chinese classic text
Li Ching (disambiguation)